Verin Shengavit (also, Verin Shengavit’, Verkhniy Shinkovit, Verkhniy Shengavit, Shinkovit, Shingaīt, and Shengavit) is a part of Shengavit District in Yerevan, Armenia.

References 

Populated places in Yerevan